Lamon Tajuan Brewster (born June 5, 1973) is an American former professional boxer who competed from 1996 to 2010. He held the WBO heavyweight title from 2004 to 2006, and is best known for scoring an upset knockout victory over Wladimir Klitschko to win the vacant title. He was ranked as the world's No.8 heavyweight by BoxRec at the conclusion of 2004. As an amateur, Brewster won the U.S. national championships in 1995, and a silver medal at that year's Pan American Games, both in the heavyweight division. Following his retirement from the sport in 2011, he became an entrepreneur and founded a consulting business.

Amateur career
Brewster won the 1995 U.S. national amateur championship as a heavyweight. Additional highlights include:

 1995 2nd place at the Pan American Games in Mar del Plata, Argentina. Results were:
Defeated Moises Rolon (Puerto Rico) PTS
Lost to Félix Savón (Cuba) RSCH-2
Brewster failed to qualify for the 1996 Atlanta Olympics after he lost to Nate Jones and DaVarryl Williamson in the trials.

Professional career

1996–2003: Prospect to contender

Brewster turned professional in 1996 and was undefeated for his first three years as a pro until losing decisions to Clifford Etienne and Charles Shufford in 2000.

2004–2005: WBO heavyweight champion and title defenses

On April 10, 2004, Brewster faced Wladimir Klitschko in a fight for the vacant World Boxing Organization championship that had been vacated by Corrie Sanders, who had upset Klitschko by knocking him out in the second round of their fight in 2003, when he decided to challenge Vitali Klitschko for the World Boxing Council title vacated when Lennox Lewis retired.

Brewster was dominated in the early going, knocked down once in the fourth round. In the fifth round, Brewster hurt Klitschko with a left hook that forced the Ukrainian fighter to use the ropes to hold himself up, which resulted in a knockdown. As the round ended, Brewster hit Klitschko with a combination of punches that caused him to go down after the bell sounded. Seeing Klitschko struggle to return to his feet, referee Robert Byrd stopped the fight and awarded a technical knockout victory to Brewster. Klitschko claimed foul play resulted in his defeat but an investigation found nothing.

For eleven years, Brewster remained the last boxer to defeat Klitschko in the ring, until Tyson Fury defeated Klitschko in a 2015 heavyweight fight. Brewster remains the second last boxer to knock Klitschko out in a bout, preceding Anthony Joshua, who won by TKO on the 11th round defeating Wladimir Klitschko on 30 April 2017.

2006–2007: Brewster vs. Liakhovich and Klitschko II

Brewster lost his WBO title by unanimous decision on April 1, 2006 to Sergei Liakhovich from Belarus in an action-packed fight. In an interview following the fight, Brewster said that he could not see with his left eye after the first round. It was later confirmed that he had suffered a detached retina in his left eye and he had to undergo surgery.

Lamon Brewster returned to the ring on July 7, 2007, losing his rematch against Wladimir Klitschko after trainer Buddy McGirt stopped the fight after the sixth round. The fight took place in Köln (Cologne), Germany, for the IBF & IBO heavyweight title.

2008–2010: Tail end of career

After two tune-up bouts, he was upset by Gbenga Oloukun by an eight-round points decision. The following year he was stopped by rising contender Robert Helenius.
At one point in his career, Brewster was managed by The Simpsons co-creator, professional poker player and philanthropist, Sam Simon,. Later Brewster left Simon and signed with manager Al Haymon.

Retirement
On January 9, 2011, Lamon Brewster officially announced his retirement as a professional boxer. Brewster cited an eye injury from his last fight with Helenius as the reason for this retirement. Further, he indicated that he believes that Helenius tampered with his gloves which caused the resulting injury to Brewster. He underwent four unsuccessful surgeries to restore sight in his left eye. Further surgery allowed him to regain vision in the eye.

Personal life

From 1993–97 Brewster was married to actress Tichina Arnold (of Martin and Everybody Hates Chris fame). Brewster remarried his current wife "Juana" Brewster in October 2000, and together they have two daughters and a son. Brewster also has one older daughter from a previous relationship. He is also the cousin of former IBF and WBO heavyweight champion Chris Byrd. Brewster has made several television appearances as well as public service announcements through his career.

Entrepreneurship
Brewster founded "Fighting Connection Consulting" in July 2011 providing expertise to professional fighters on training methods, psychology, nutrition, conditioning, team building, and publicity.

Professional boxing record

References

External links

1973 births
Living people
African-American boxers
Boxers from Indiana
Sportspeople from Indianapolis
Winners of the United States Championship for amateur boxers
World Boxing Organization champions
Boxers at the 1995 Pan American Games
American male boxers
World heavyweight boxing champions
Pan American Games silver medalists for the United States
Pan American Games medalists in boxing
Medalists at the 1995 Pan American Games
21st-century African-American sportspeople
20th-century African-American sportspeople